Kootapuli is a small coastal village in Radhapuram taluk, Tirunelveli district, Tamil Nadu, India. Kootapuli is close to the Koodankulam Nuclear Power Plant.

In 2013, some residents of Kootapuli were involved in protests against the Kudankulam Nuclear Power Plant. In 2018, some residents were involved the Thoothukudi violence, a series of protests that ended with police firing on civilians.

References 

Villages in Tirunelveli district